The index of physics articles is split into multiple pages due to its size.

To navigate by individual letter use the table of contents below.

D

D band (NATO)
D band (waveguide)
D'Alembert's paradox
D'Alembert's principle
D'Alembert force
D'Alembert–Euler condition
D-brane
D-term
D. Van Holliday
D0 experiment
DAFNE
DAMA/LIBRA
DAMA/NaI
DBrn
DCOMP
DEAP
DEEP2 Redshift Survey
DELPHI experiment
DESY
DGLAP
DGP model
DIDO (nuclear reactor)
DIII-D (tokamak)
DNA condensation
DNG metamaterial
DONUT
DUMAND Project
D meson
Daan Frenkel
Dai Chuanzeng
Dale A. Anderson
Dalitz plot
Dallas Abbott
Dalton's law
Daly detector
Damping ratio
Damping matrix
Damping torque
Dan Danknick
Dan Jacobo Beninson
Dan McKenzie (geophysicist)
Dan Shechtman
Danah Zohar
Dangerously irrelevant operator
Dangling bond
Daniel Bernoulli
Daniel C. Tsui
Daniel Chonghan Hong
Daniel D. Joseph
Daniel Frank Walls
Daniel Friedan
Daniel Frost Comstock
Daniel Gabriel Fahrenheit
Daniel Gillespie
Daniel Gottesman
Daniel Gralath
Daniel Isaachsen (physicist)
Daniel Joseph Bradley
Daniel Kastler
Daniel Kleppner
Daniel L. Stein
Daniel Lidar
Daniel Loss
Daniel Webster Hering
Daniel Z. Freedman
Daniel Zajfman
Dannie Heineman Prize for Mathematical Physics
Dante Tessieri
Daraf
Darcy's law
Darcy friction factor formulae
Darcy–Weisbach equation
Daresbury Laboratory
Dark-energy-dominated era
Dark-energy star
DarkSide (dark matter experiment)
Dark current (physics)
Dark energy
Dark flow
Dark fluid
Dark galaxy
Dark matter
Dark optical trap
Dark radiation
Dark star (Newtonian mechanics)
Dark star (dark matter)
Dark state
Dart leader
Darwin–Radau equation
Darwin drift
Dasar
Data acquisition
Data analysis
Daulat Singh Kothari
Dave Green (astrophysicist)
Dave Thomas (physicist)
Davey–Stewartson equation
David A. Frank-Kamenetskii
David A. Weitz
David Adler (physicist)
David Adler Lectureship Award in the Field of Materials Physics
David Allan Bromley
David Alter
David Avison
David Awschalom
David B. Kaplan
David B. Malament
David Bates (physicist)
David Berenstein
David Blair (physicist)
David Bohm
David Brewster
David Callaway
David Carroll (physicist)
David Ceperley
David Chandler (chemist)
David Chapman (scientist)
David Cockayne
David Cohen (physicist)
David Crighton
David Delano Clark
David Deming 
David Deutsch
David Douglass
David Dunlap Observatory
David E. Aspnes
David E. Goldman
David E. Kaplan (physicist)
David E. Pritchard
David Enskog
David Evans (mathematician)
David Faiman
David Field (astrophysicist)
David Finkelstein
David Flower
David Goodstein
David Griffiths (physicist)
David Gross
David H. Frisch
David H. Lyth
David H. Munro
David Halliday (physicist)
David C. Hanna
David Hestenes
David Hilbert
David J. Brenner
David J. C. MacKay
David J. Lockwood
David J. Smith (physicist)
David J. Thouless
David Jaffray
David John Candlin
David K. Ferry
David Kaiser
David Keynes Hill
David Klyshko
David L. Fried
David L. Webster
David Lee (physicist)
David Lindley (physicist)
David M. Dennison
David McNiven Garner
David Medved
David Mermin
David Mervyn Blow
David N. Payne
David Norman (ornithologist)
David Olive
David P. Landau
David Parry (biophysicist)
David Pegg (physicist)
David Pines
David R. Nygren
David Reitze
David Robert Nelson
David Ruelle
David S. Cafiso
David Saltzberg
David Schramm (astrophysicist)
David Shoenberg
David Spergel
David States
David Strangway
David Tabor
David Todd Wilkinson
David Vanderbilt
David W. Turner
David Wallace (physicist)
David Wands
David Willey (physicist)
David William Dye
Davidson correction
Davisson–Germer Prize in Atomic or Surface Physics
Davisson–Germer experiment
Davydov soliton
Dawes' limit
Dawn chorus (electromagnetic)
Day length
Daya Bay Reactor Neutrino Experiment
Daylight
Daylight factor
Dayton Miller
Dbx (noise reduction)
DeWitt Bristol Brace
DeWitt notation
De Broglie–Bohm theory
De Bruijn graph
De Haas–van Alphen effect
De Laval nozzle
De Magnete
De Sitter double star experiment
De Sitter invariant special relativity
De Sitter precession
De Sitter space
De Sitter universe
De Sitter–Schwarzschild metric
De motu corporum in gyrum
De revolutionibus orbium coelestium
Dead time
Dean number
Deane B. Judd
Death by Black Hole: And Other Cosmic Quandaries
Debendra Mohan Bose
Deborah S. Jin
Deborah number
Debra Searles
Debye frequency
Debye model
Debye relaxation
Debye sheath
Debye–Falkenhagen effect
Debye–Waller factor
Decay chain
Decay energy
Decay heat
Decay product
Deceleration parameter
Decibel
Decollimation
Deconfinement
Decorrelation
Decoy state
Deep-dose equivalent
Deep-level transient spectroscopy
Deep-level trap
Deep Impact (spacecraft)
Deep Underground Science and Engineering Laboratory
Deep inelastic scattering
Defining equation (physical chemistry)
Defining equation (physics)
Deflected slipstream
Deflection (physics)
Defocus aberration
Deformable body
Deformation (engineering)
Deformation (mechanics)
Degasification
Degasperis–Procesi equation
Degaussing
Degenerate energy levels
Degenerate matter
Degenerate orbital
Degree of coherence
Degree of ionization
Degrees of freedom (physics and chemistry)
Dehydron
Dejan Milošević
Delaunay tessellation field estimator
Delayed choice quantum eraser
Delayed nuclear radiation
Delocalized electron
Delta-v
Delta-v (physics)
Delta-v budget
Delta baryon
Delta potential
Delta ray
Delta wing
Demagnetizing field
Dember effect
Demetrios Christodoulou
Demetrius Hondros
Democratic principle
Denaturation (fissile materials)
Dendrite (metal)
Deng Jiaxian
Denge
Denis Evans
Denis Papin
Denis Rousseau
Denis Weaire
Dennis Dieks
Dennis Gabor
Dennis William Sciama
Dense plasma focus
Densitometry
Density
Density functional theory
Density matrix
Density matrix renormalization group
Density of air
Density of states
Density wave theory
Denys Wilkinson
Denys Wilkinson Building
Department of Applied Science, UC Davis
Department of Atomic Energy (India)
Departure function
Dephasing
Depolarization ratio
Deposition (aerosol physics)
Deposition (phase transition)
Depression storage capacity
Depth of field
Depth–slope product
Derecho
Derek Abbott
Derek Barton
Derivation of the Navier–Stokes equations
Deriving the Schwarzschild solution
Desert (particle physics)
Desmond King-Hele
Desorption
Detached eddy simulation
Detailed balance
Detection of internally reflected Cherenkov light
Determinism
Deterministic system
Detlef Quadfasel
Detlev Buchholz
Deuterium
Deuterium-depleted water
Deuterium burning
Deutsche Physik
Deutsche Physikalische Gesellschaft
Deutsch–Jozsa algorithm
Dew
Dew point
Dew point depression
Dewbow
Dewetting
Dexter electron transfer
Dextrorotation and levorotation
Di-positronium
Diabatic
Dialogue Concerning the Two Chief World Systems
Dialysis tubing
Dialyt lens
Dialyte lens
Diamagnetism
Diamond Light Source
Diamond anvil cell
Diamond cubic
Diamond dust
Diamond knife
Diaphragm (acoustics)
Diaphragm (mechanical device)
Diatomic carbon
Dibaryon
Dichroic filter
Dichroism
Dichromatism
Dick Teresi
Diederik Korteweg
Dielectric
Dielectric barrier discharge
Dielectric breakdown model
Dielectric complex reluctance
Dielectric dispersion
Dielectric heating
Dielectric mirror
Dielectric relaxation
Dielectric reluctance
Dielectric spectroscopy
Dielectric strength
Dielectric wall accelerator
Dielectrophoresis
Diesel cycle
Dieter Langbein
Dieter Lüst
Dieter Matthaei
Dieter Weichert
Dietrich Küchemann
Diffeomorphism constraint
Difference density map
Differential entropy
Differential rotation
Differential scanning calorimetry
Differential stress
Diffraction
Diffraction-limited system
Diffraction grating
Diffraction standard
Diffraction tomography
Diffuse Infrared Background Experiment
Diffuse element method
Diffuse reflection
Diffuse sky radiation
Diffuser (optics)
Diffusing-wave spectroscopy
Diffusion
Diffusion (acoustics)
Diffusion current
Diffusion damping
Diffusion equation
Diffuson
Digital holographic microscopy
Digital magnetofluidics
Digital physics
Digital room correction
Dihedral (aircraft)
Dilatant
Dilaton
Dilution of precision (GPS)
Dimensional analysis
Dimensional deconstruction
Dimensional reduction
Dimensional regularization
Dimensional transmutation
Dimensionless Hubble parameter
Dimensionless physical constant
Dimensionless quantity
Dimitri Nalivkin
Dimitri Nanopoulos
Dimitri Riabouchinsky
Dineutron
Diocotron instability
Diode
Diode-pumped solid-state laser
Dioptric correction
Dioptrics
Dip circle
Dipan Ghosh
Dipankar Home
Dipleidoscope
Dipolar
Dipolar polarization
Dipole
Dipole (disambiguation)
Dipole anisotropy
Dipole magnet
Dipole model of the Earth's magnetic field
Dipole–dipole attraction
Diproton
Diquark
Dirac Prize
Dirac adjoint
Dirac delta function
Dirac equation
Dirac equation in the algebra of physical space
Dirac fermion
Dirac large numbers hypothesis
Dirac operator
Dirac sea
Dirac spinor
Dirac string
Direct-current discharge
Direct and indirect band gaps
Direct laser lithography
Direct laser writing
Direct numerical simulation
Direct quantum chemistry
Directed-energy weapon
Directed percolation
Directional-hemispherical reflectance
Directional Recoil Identification From Tracks
Directional sound
Directional stability
Directivity
Dirichlet problem
Dirk Bouwmeester
Dirk Brockmann
Dirk Coster
Dirk Kreimer
Dirk Polder
Dirk Reuyl
Dirk ter Haar
Disc permeameter
Discharge pressure
Discotic liquid crystal
Discoveries of extrasolar planets
Discovery of cosmic microwave background radiation
Discrete Lorentzian quantum gravity
Discrete dipole approximation
Discrete dipole approximation codes
Discrete element method
Discrete optimized protein energy
Discrete spectrum (physics)
Discrete symmetry
Disgregation
Disorder operator
Dispersion-shifted fiber
Dispersion (optics)
Dispersion (physics)
Dispersion (radiation)
Dispersion (water waves)
Dispersion relation
Dispersive mass transfer
Dispersive prism
Displacement (fluid)
Displacement (vector)
Displacement current
Displacement field (mechanics)
Displacement operator
Displacement thickness
Displayed average noise level
Disruptive discharge
Dissipation
Dissipation factor
Dissipative particle dynamics
Dissipative system
Dissociative recombination
Dissymmetry of lift
Distance measures (cosmology)
Distance modulus
Distortion (optics)
Distortion free energy density
Distributed Bragg reflector
Distributed acoustic sensing
Distributed feedback laser
Distribution function
Divergence
Divergence theorem
Divertor
Dmitri Ivanenko
Dmitri Skobeltsyn
Dmitri Z. Garbuzov
Dmitry Dmitrievich Maksutov
Dmitry Shirkov
Dmitry Zubarev
Dmrg of Heisenberg model
Does God Play Dice? The New Mathematics of Chaos
Dogan Abukay
Domain theory of ferromagnetism
Domain wall (magnetism)
Domain wall (optics)
Domain wall (string theory)
Domenico Pacini
Dominique Lorentz
Don Hendrix
Don Kirkham
Don L. Anderson
Don Misener
Donald A. Glaser
Donald Braben
Donald Cooksey
Donald Ginsberg
Donald H. Weingarten
Donald Hill Perkins
Donald J. Hughes
Donald Keck
Donald Lynden-Bell
Donald MacCrimmon MacKay
Donald Marolf
Donald N. Langenberg
Donald R. F. Harleman
Donald R. Herriott
Donald William Kerst
Donor (semiconductors)
Donor impurity
Dopant
Doping (semiconductor)
Doppler broadening
Doppler cooling
Doppler cooling limit
Doppler effect
Doppler spectroscopy
Dopplergraph
Dorothy Nickerson
Dorte Juul Jensen
Dose fractionation
Dosimeter
Dosimetry
Double-exchange mechanism
Double-slit experiment
Double Chooz
Double beta decay
Double diffusive convection
Double electron capture
Double inverted pendulum
Double ionization
Double negative metamaterial
Double negative metamaterials
Double pendulum
Doublet (lens)
Doublet state
Doublet–triplet splitting problem
Doubly ionized oxygen
Doubly special relativity
Doughnut theory of the universe
Douglas Hartree
Douglas Osheroff
Douglas P. Verret
Douglas Ross (physicist)
Douglas Sea Scale
Douglas Warrick
Down quark
Downburst
Downforce
Downhill folding
Downton pump
Downwash
Drag-resistant aerospike
Drag (fluid mechanics)
Drag (physics)
Drag Polar
Drag coefficient
Drag count
Drag crisis
Drag divergence Mach number
Drag equation
Dragon reactor
Draupner wave
Drell–Yan process
Drift (plasma physics)
Drift current
Drift velocity
Drinking bird
Driven oscillations
Drop (liquid)
Drude model
Drummond Matthews
Dry-bulb temperature
Dry ice
Du Noüy ring method
Du Qinghua
Dual lattice
Dual polarization interferometry
Dual resonance model
Dual superconductor model
Dual tensor
Duality (electricity and magnetism)
Duane H. Cooper
Duane–Hunt law
Ducted propeller
Ductility
Dudley Williams (physicist)
Duhamel's integral
Duhem–Margules equation
Dulong–Petit law
Dumb hole
Duncan Haldane
Duncan J. Watts
Duncan T. Moore
Duoplasmatron
Durmus A. Demir
Duru–Kleinert transformation
Dust (relativity)
Dust devil
Dust solution
Dusty plasma
Dutch roll
Dušan Ristanović
Dušanka Đokić
Dwarf galaxy problem
Dwarf planet
Dyadics
Dye-sensitized solar cell
Dye laser
Dynameter
Dynamic aperture
Dynamic aperture (accelerator physics)
Dynamic equilibrium
Dynamic light scattering
Dynamic modulus
Dynamic nuclear polarisation
Dynamic pressure
Dynamic scattering mode
Dynamic speckle
Dynamic stall
Dynamic structure factor
Dynamical billiards
Dynamical friction
Dynamical horizon
Dynamical simulation
Dynamical symmetry breaking
Dynamical system
Dynamical system (definition)
Dynamical theory of diffraction
Dynamical time scale
Dynamics (mechanics)
Dynamics of Markovian particles
Dynamics of the celestial spheres
Dynamitron
Dynamo theory
Dyon
Dyson's eternal intelligence
Dyson series
Dysprosium titanate
Dénes Berényi
Désiré van Monckhoven
Détecteur à Grande Acceptance pour la Physique Photonucléaire Expérimentale (DAPHNE)
Dühring's rule

Indexes of physics articles